Zak Ben Emmerson (born 12 August 2004) is an English professional footballer who plays as a forward for EFL Championship club Blackpool.

Career
On 22 October 2019, Emmerson made his debut for Oldham Athletic as an 85th minute substitute in a 2–0 win against Walsall. Upon doing so, Emmerson became the second youngest player in English Football League history at 15 years and 73 days old, 28 days older than the record youngest player Reuben Noble-Lazarus.

On 15 July 2020, Emmerson joined the academy and development squad of Premier League side Brighton & Hove Albion for an undisclosed fee.

On 1 September 2022, Emmerson joined EFL Championship club Blackpool for an undisclosed fee.

International career
On 3 September 2021, Emmerson made his England U18s debut during a 1–1 draw with Wales at Newport International Sports Village.

Career statistics

References

2004 births
Living people
Association football forwards
English footballers
Oldham Athletic A.F.C. players
Brighton & Hove Albion F.C. players
Blackpool F.C. players
English Football League players
England youth international footballers